In the field of hyperbolic geometry, the hexagonal tiling honeycomb is one of 11 regular paracompact honeycombs in 3-dimensional hyperbolic space. It is paracompact because it has cells composed of an infinite number of faces.  Each cell is a hexagonal tiling whose vertices lie on a horosphere, a surface in hyperbolic space that approaches a single ideal point at infinity.

The Schläfli symbol of the hexagonal tiling honeycomb is {6,3,3}.  Since that of the hexagonal tiling is {6,3}, this honeycomb has three such hexagonal tilings meeting at each edge.  Since the Schläfli symbol of the tetrahedron is {3,3}, the vertex figure of this honeycomb is a tetrahedron.  Thus, four hexagonal tilings meet at each vertex of this honeycomb, six hexagons meet at each vertex, and four edges meet at each vertex.

Images

Viewed in perspective outside of a Poincaré disk model, the image above shows one hexagonal tiling cell within the honeycomb, and its mid-radius horosphere (the horosphere incident with edge midpoints). In this projection, the hexagons grow infinitely small towards the infinite boundary, asymptoting towards a single ideal point. It can be seen as similar to the order-3 apeirogonal tiling, {∞,3} of H2, with horocycles circumscribing vertices of apeirogonal faces.

Symmetry constructions 

It has a total of five reflectional constructions from five related Coxeter groups all with four mirrors and only the first being regular:  [6,3,3],  [3,6,3],  [6,3,6],  [6,3[3]] and [3[3,3]] , having 1, 4, 6, 12 and 24 times larger fundamental domains respectively. In Coxeter notation subgroup markups, they are related as: [6,(3,3)*] (remove 3 mirrors, index 24 subgroup); [3,6,3*] or [3*,6,3] (remove 2 mirrors, index 6 subgroup); [1+,6,3,6,1+] (remove two orthogonal mirrors, index 4 subgroup); all of these are isomorphic to [3[3,3]].

Related polytopes and honeycombs 

The hexagonal tiling honeycomb is a regular hyperbolic honeycomb in 3-space, and one of 11 which are paracompact.

It is one of 15 uniform paracompact honeycombs in the [6,3,3] Coxeter group, along with its dual, the order-6 tetrahedral honeycomb.

It is part of a sequence of regular polychora, which include the 5-cell {3,3,3}, tesseract {4,3,3}, and 120-cell {5,3,3} of Euclidean 4-space, along with other hyperbolic honeycombs containing tetrahedral vertex figures.

It is also part of a sequence of regular honeycombs of the form {6,3,p}, which are each composed of hexagonal tiling cells:

Rectified hexagonal tiling honeycomb 

The rectified hexagonal tiling honeycomb, t1{6,3,3},  has tetrahedral and trihexagonal tiling facets, with a triangular prism vertex figure. The  half-symmetry construction alternates two types of tetrahedra.

Truncated hexagonal tiling honeycomb 

The truncated hexagonal tiling honeycomb, t0,1{6,3,3},  has tetrahedral and truncated hexagonal tiling facets, with a triangular pyramid vertex figure.

It is similar to the 2D hyperbolic truncated order-3 apeirogonal tiling, t{∞,3} with apeirogonal and triangle faces:

Bitruncated hexagonal tiling honeycomb 

The bitruncated hexagonal tiling honeycomb or bitruncated order-6 tetrahedral honeycomb, t1,2{6,3,3},  has truncated tetrahedron and hexagonal tiling cells, with a digonal disphenoid vertex figure.

Cantellated hexagonal tiling honeycomb 

The cantellated hexagonal tiling honeycomb, t0,2{6,3,3},  has octahedron, rhombitrihexagonal tiling, and triangular prism cells, with a wedge vertex figure.

Cantitruncated hexagonal tiling honeycomb 

The cantitruncated hexagonal tiling honeycomb, t0,1,2{6,3,3},  has truncated tetrahedron, truncated trihexagonal tiling, and triangular prism cells, with a mirrored sphenoid vertex figure.

Runcinated hexagonal tiling honeycomb 

The runcinated hexagonal tiling honeycomb, t0,3{6,3,3},  has tetrahedron, hexagonal tiling, hexagonal prism, and triangular prism cells, with an irregular triangular antiprism vertex figure.

Runcitruncated hexagonal tiling honeycomb 

The runcitruncated hexagonal tiling honeycomb, t0,1,3{6,3,3},  has cuboctahedron, triangular prism, dodecagonal prism, and truncated hexagonal tiling cells, with an isosceles-trapezoidal pyramid vertex figure.

Runcicantellated hexagonal tiling honeycomb 

The runcicantellated hexagonal tiling honeycomb or runcitruncated order-6 tetrahedral honeycomb, t0,2,3{6,3,3},  has truncated tetrahedron, hexagonal prism, and rhombitrihexagonal tiling cells, with an isosceles-trapezoidal pyramid vertex figure.

Omnitruncated hexagonal tiling honeycomb 

The omnitruncated hexagonal tiling honeycomb or omnitruncated order-6 tetrahedral honeycomb, t0,1,2,3{6,3,3},  has truncated octahedron, hexagonal prism, dodecagonal prism, and truncated trihexagonal tiling cells, with an irregular tetrahedron vertex figure.

See also 
 Convex uniform honeycombs in hyperbolic space
 Regular tessellations of hyperbolic 3-space
 Paracompact uniform honeycombs
 Alternated hexagonal tiling honeycomb

References 

Coxeter, Regular Polytopes, 3rd. ed., Dover Publications, 1973. . (Tables I and II: Regular polytopes and honeycombs, pp. 294–296)
 The Beauty of Geometry: Twelve Essays (1999), Dover Publications,  (Chapter 10, Regular Honeycombs in Hyperbolic Space ) Table III
 Jeffrey R. Weeks The Shape of Space, 2nd edition  (Chapters 16–17: Geometries on Three-manifolds I,II)
N. W. Johnson, R. Kellerhals, J. G. Ratcliffe, S. T. Tschantz, The size of a hyperbolic Coxeter simplex, Transformation Groups (1999), Volume 4, Issue 4, pp 329–353  
 N. W. Johnson, R. Kellerhals, J. G. Ratcliffe, S. T. Tschantz, Commensurability classes of hyperbolic Coxeter groups, (2002) H3: p130.

External links 

John Baez, Visual Insight: {6,3,3} Honeycomb (2014/03/15) 
John Baez, Visual Insight: {6,3,3} Honeycomb in Upper Half Space (2013/09/15)
John Baez, Visual Insight: Truncated {6,3,3} Honeycomb (2016/12/01)

Hexagonal tilings
Honeycombs (geometry)